Donal "Donald" O'Brien (15 September 1930 – 29 November 2003) was an Irish film and television actor. In his near 40-year career, O'Brien appeared in dozens of stage performances and in more than 60 film and television productions.

O'Brien made his feature film debut in 1953 with Anatole Litvak's war drama Act of Love. He studied acting in Dublin and initially joined the Gate Theatre at age 19 before making the transition to film several years later. O'Brien's performance in The Train (1964), in which he played a Wehrmacht Feldwebel, led to his first break-out role in Grand Prix (1966) starring alongside James Garner and Eva Marie Saint.

He was particularly known for his performances in the Spaghetti Western genre of the late-1960s and '70s, with memorable roles in Run, Man, Run (1968), Four of the Apocalypse (1975), Keoma (1976), Mannaja (1977) and Silver Saddle (1978), as well as later appearances in Italian horror, post-apocalyptic, and zombie films. In 1980, O'Brien suffered a head injury which left him in a coma for three days and partially paralysed. Though eventually recovering from his injuries, his mobility was significantly limited for the rest of his life. In spite of this, O'Brien continued to work for another decade in the Italian film industry, almost exclusively for directors Lucio Fulci and Joe D'Amato. His last years included supporting roles in The Name of the Rose (1986) and The Devil's Daughter (1991).

Early life
O'Brien was born in Pau, Pyrénées-Atlantiques in France on 15 September 1930. His Irish-born father had been a US Army cavalry officer and left the service after being wounded in the Spanish–American War. His father then returned to Ireland with the pension he received for his military service, sold the family farm and retired to the South of France where he eventually met and married an English governess. O'Brien's family moved around during the next few years before settling in the country's northern coast. During the Second World War, and the Nazi occupation of France, his family fled the country to Dublin, Ireland. It was during this period that one of O'Brien's brothers, among the dozen Irish volunteers serving in the Royal Air Force, was killed in action.

Growing up, he was a great admirer of fellow Irishmen William Butler Yeats and Michael Collins, the French adventurer André Malraux, composer Maurice Ravel, the Italian artist Giorgio de Chirico, German boxer Max Schmeling, English actor Sir Laurence Olivier and especially handicapped Second World War ace Douglas Bader.

Acting career

Early stage and film career
In the autumn of 1948, O'Brien attended grammar school in Dublin where he was studying for final exam. He sat for his matriculation, for "a first-class ticket" to university, but failed in mathematics. Instead of taking classes for another year, he decided instead to join a drama school. He received leading roles for several local stage performances and, after joining the Dublin Gate Theatre, was involved with productions headed by Irish dramatist Micheál Mac Liammóir. O'Brien's profile was significantly raised while with the Gate Theatre, however, he grew dissatisfied with continuously being cast in walk-on roles. He decided to move to France where found employment with the US Army in Paris as an office worker. O'Brien was part of a boxing club while in Dublin and later involved in a fight with a German all-in-wrestler at a café at Place Pigalle.

In 1953, the 23-year-old O'Brien made his first appearance in a feature film, Anatole Litvak's war drama Act of Love, in which he had a brief speaking role. He spent the next few years in France and had minor roles in several other films including The Wretches (1960), Saint Tropez Blues (1961), Dynamite Jack (1961), Tales of Paris (1962) and, in an uncredited role, as an English priest in The Trial of Joan of Arc (1962); he also made his French television debut guest starring on L'inspecteur Leclerc enquête. The following year, he had another brief role as a Wehrmacht Feldwebel in The Train (1964), which so impressed director John Frankenheimer that he cast O'Brien as a supporting character in Grand Prix (1966), his first break-out role, co-starring James Garner and Eva Marie Saint. O'Brien credited Burt Lancaster with helping himself and other younger actors on the set of The Train.

His later Grand Prix co-star James Garner, however, struck him as,

In between the two projects, he played character roles in several action and war films, mostly French-Italian co-productions, including Weekend at Dunkirk, Passeport diplomatique agent K 8, La Métamorphose des cloportes, Three Rooms in Manhattan, Nick Carter and Red Club, La Vie de chateau and La Ligne de démarcation. O'Brien played an RAF pilot, much like his late brother, in the latter film. He also travelled to Yugoslavia to work on Jean Dréville's La Fayette.

Leading man in Spaghetti Westerns
In 1967, O'Brien was brought to Italy to star in Sergio Sollima's cult Spaghetti Western Run, Man, Run! with Tomas Milian. His portrayal of ex-American lawman turned soldier of fortune Nathaniel Cassidy led to future leading roles in the genre for a number of years. Shortly after filming, he was interviewed in the 1968 television documentary Western, Italian Style. Sollima, according to O'Brien, was "considered to be the intellectual among the Western filmmakers. I enjoyed working with him. He was a very intelligent and gifted man." It was during his years working in Italy that he changed his given name from "Donal" to "Donald", given his film contracts and credits frequently misspelled his name, banks would refuse to cash his checks under his birth name. He ended up having to the embassy to have a new passport issued with "Donald" in parentheses.

By the early 1970s, however, the genre was already starting its slow decline and saw O'Brien, usually a villain (or occasional anti-hero), in increasingly low-budget productions such as Giuseppe Vari's The Last Traitor (1971), with Maurice Poli and Dino Strano, Paid in Blood (1971) with Jeff Cameron and Sheriff of Rock Springs (1971) with Cosetta Greco and Richard Harrison. He made another picture with Jeff Cameron, God Is My Colt .45 (1972), two with William Berger, Kung Fu Brothers in the Wild West (1973) and The Executioner of God (1973), and Six Bounty Killers for a Massacre (1973) with Attilio Dottesio and Robert Woods. He later recalled having a somewhat strained relationship with Berger, mostly due to his drug issues, and was given parts originally intended for the older actor when was either unable to perform or had been arrested. O'Brien also starred in one of his first non-western roles, in the Italian horror film Il sesso della strega, as the investigating police inspector.

That same year, O'Brien was asked by Harrison to co-star in his own Spaghetti Western, Two Brothers in Trinity (1973), which was co-directed by Renzo Genta. In the film, O'Brien played devout Mormon missionary Lester O'Hara, half-brother of Harrison's womanising amoral character Jesse Smith. The next year, he had supporting role White Fang to the Rescue (1974) and Challenge to White Fang (1974), the latter being his first film with Lucio Fulci. He was again cast by Fulci in Four of the Apocalypse (1975). O'Brien had starring roles in the last few "twilight" Spaghetti Westerns, Keoma (1977), A Man Called Blade (1977) and Fulci's fourth and final western They Died with Their Boots On (1978). O'Brien called Fulci one of his most favourite directors to work with and was deeply saddened when learning of his death in a 1996 interview calling him "a truly original human being with a great love for cinema".

Foray into exploitation and horror films
While filming his last Spaghetti Westerns, O'Brien appeared in one of Joe D'Amato's entries of the Emanuelle series, Emanuelle and the Last Cannibals (1977), as white Safari hunter Donald McKenzie. In the film, he and his wife Maggie, played by another one-time Spaghetti Western star Susan Scott, encounter Emanuelle (Laura Gemser) in the Amazon and join her expedition to find a lost tribe of cannibals. He also played the villainous Nazi commandant in Marino Girolami's WWII farce Kakkientruppen (1977), police officer Sgt. Stricker in Gianfranco Parolini's Yeti: Giant of the 20th Century (1977), mercenary Major Hagerty in Joe D'Amato's Tough To Kill (1978) and as the SS Commander in Enzo G. Castellari's The Inglorious Bastards (1978). One of O'Brien's co-stars, Bo Svenson, taught him how to say several lines in German for the film. In 1979, O'Brien starred as an exorcist the nunsploitation film Images in a Convent, another D'Amato picture, which would be the first of many future religious-themed roles.

Over the next year, he appeared in two films by Marino Girolami. The first was a cameo appearance in the sex comedy Sesso profondo and the second, a much larger role, in Zombie Holocaust as the main villain Dr. Obrero. His depiction of the "mad scientist" became very popular among horror fans and remains one of the most infamous characters in the genre.

Later career in Italian cinema
O'Brian starred in his first American production, the television film The Day Christ Died, as a Roman soldier in 1980. Later that year, while staying in Parisian hotel, he slipped in the bathroom and hit his head. He was in a coma for three days and discovered half of his body was paralysed shortly after waking up. It took him nearly four years to recover from his injuries though he would have limited mobility for the rest of his life. This would also reduce the range of roles he could play.

He made his return to acting in the 1980s post-apocalyptic films The New Gladiators and 2020 Texas Gladiators directed by Lucio Fulci and Joe D'Amato respectively. In D'Amato's film, he played the main villain, the Dark One. The death scene for his character featured an elaborate special effect scene for the time, in which his skull was "cracked open" by an axe, but the producers felt it was too over the top and cut it from the film. His handicap continued to trouble him over the years, being necessary to use a walking stick, and as a result his appearances became sporadic during the rest of the decade. In 1986, he played another "mad scientist" in Sergio Martino's science fiction film Vendetta dal futuro/ aka "Fists of Steel". He also played a supporting part, as Pietro d'Assisi, in The Name of the Rose directed by Jean-Jacques Annaud that same year. Two years later, he played the mad housekeeper Valkos in Ghosthouse.

In 1990, O'Brien was cast as a Sicilian baron in Marco Modugno's Il Briganti, among the locations filmed included Hadrian's Villa, however the film was never released. He had roles in three other films; the historical drama Una vita scellerata, the post-apocalyptic film Flight from Paradise and Quest for the Mighty Sword. In "Quest", he played yet another villain, Prince Gunther, opposite Eric Allan Kramer and Margaret Lenzey. He was also joined by Laura Gemser who played his sister Kriemhild. He was supposed to appear in a somewhat risque cameo for Tinto Brass' erotic film Paprika but his scene was lost on the cutting room floor.

Semi-retirement

His last regular film roles were in Return From Death (1991), The Devil's Daughter/  aka "The Sect" (1991) and Sparrow (1993). As he became more active, however, it was around this time that O'Brien suffered another accident. While walking on a beach with two of his brothers, he attempted a short sprint but fell and was unable to get back up. His brothers were able to get him to a hospital where it was discovered that the hip bones on one side of his body were severely damaged due to being overly stressed. In March 1996, he gave a rare interview with Euro Trash Cinema, a popular European exploitation film magazine, in which he discussed his early life and career, former co-stars and his thoughts on the state of the Italian film industry. His last film was Honey Sweet Love, in 1999.

He died in Andernos-les-Bains in France.

Filmography

References

External links

Remembering Donal O'Brien

1930 births
2003 deaths
People from Pau, Pyrénées-Atlantiques
Male actors from Dublin (city)
Male actors from Rome
Irish male film actors
Male Spaghetti Western actors
French male film actors